Mořina is a municipality and village in Beroun District in the Central Bohemian Region of the Czech Republic. It has about 900 inhabitants.

Administrative parts
Villages of Dolní Roblín and Trněný Újezd are administrative parts of Mořina.

Sights
Mořina is known for Velká Amerika, which is a picturesque former limestone quarry with a pair of lakes on the bottom.

In Mořina there are a former synagogue and Jewish cemetery, which was founded in 1735–1736.

Notable people
Karl Joseph, Count Morzin (1717–1783), aristocrat and music patron
Jakob Eduard Polak (1818–1891), Austrian physician

References

Villages in the Beroun District
Morzin family